Bug is a 2002 American comedy film, directed by Phil Hay and Matt Manfredi. It was released on February 28, 2002.

Plot
A young boy steps on a bug, killing it. A man getting into his car witnesses the senseless murder and crosses the street to chastise the boy. In the extra minute this takes, his parking meter expires and a meter maid is right there to issue a ticket. The now angry man throws the ticket into the storm drain. The ticket clogs a pipe, causing water damage elsewhere. This series of cause-and-effect chain reactions propels an eclectic group of individuals in Silver Lake, Los Angeles, to a common destiny.

Cast 
As credited, in order of appearance:
 John Carroll Lynch
 Megan Cavanagh
 Grant Heslov
 Brian Cox
 Alexis Cruz
 Jamie Kennedy
 Sarah Paulson
 Ed Begley Jr.
 Phil Hay
 Jon Huertas
 Alexandra Wescourt
 Christopher Thornton
 Steven Shenbaum
 Chris Bauer
 Christina Kirk
 Hedy Burress
 John Doe
 John Lehr
 Kent Faulcon
 Juliette Jeffers
 Jim Ortlieb
 Matt Manfredi
 Trudie Styler
 Dearbhla Molloy
 Guy Siner
 Michael Hitchcock
 Arabella Field
 Judy Prescott
 Wade Williams
 Maz Jobrani
 Carol Locatell
 Benjamin John Parrillo
 Bellina Logan

External links

2002 films
2002 comedy films
American comedy films
Films set in Los Angeles
Films scored by Theodore Shapiro
2002 directorial debut films
Films directed by Phil Hay (screenwriter)
Films with screenplays by Matt Manfredi
Films directed by Matt Manfredi
2000s English-language films
2000s American films